Central High School is a public high school in north Fort Worth,  Texas, United States. The school is located entirely within the Keller Independent School District, and primarily serves neighborhoods adjacent to Highway 377 to the east and North Beach Street to the west. As of the 2018-2019 school year, the campus housed 2,541 students in grades 9-12. As of 2015, the school was rated "Met Standard" by the Texas Education Agency.

History

The area of what eventually became known as Central High School was bought out by Keller ISD following the approval of a $89,700,000 bond on December 6, 1997. The school's proposal fell under proposition three, which was regarded as land for potential future school sites. Anticipating further growth, Keller ISD approved a $179.7 million bond in the fall of 2000. The new bond, which included the district's third high school alongside five additional elementary schools, ascribed the development to their situation between DFW Airport and Alliance Airport.

As construction of the new school went underway, the district's Board of Trustees named Keller High School Principal Randy Baker as the new principal of the high school. Following Keller ISD heritage of upcoming students naming schools, the school's name, mascot and colors were voted on by students, and the new school earned the name Central High School, due to its central location between the two other KISD high schools. The mascot is presently the Chargers and is represented by a lightning bolt.

The school hosted its inaugural body of about 800 freshmen and sophomores the following year, in August of 2003. The school presently has 2,541 students as of the 2018-2019 school year.

The school was in Keller originally, but that area was annexed into Fort Worth.

Athletics
Central is classified as a 6A school by the Texas UIL, facing, among others, their fellow district opponents, Keller High School, Timber Creek High School and Fossil Ridge High School. The districts offers almost all major sports to students on campus, with exceptions to sports such as swimming, which is taught and played at the Keller Natatorium, golfing, and others.

JROTC
Central High School is the home of the first JROTC unit for the Keller ISD school district, AFJROTC TX-20055 Thunderbolts, in honor of the A-10 Thunderbolt II, and in keeping with the lightning bolt theme of the school. The program, sponsored by the United States Armed Forces, has participants across the four Keller high schools.

Publications
Newspaper: The Illuminator is a free monthly collaboration.

Yearbook: The Bolt is annually distributed at a cost.

Media: The Circuit is a weekly TV newscast.

Band
Formed in August 2003, the Central High School Charger Band began with 73 members. The following year the band moved to 4A Varsity competition. Central was reclassified from 4A to 5A (now 6A) in 2006 and has complete in the state's largest classification ever since. 

In 2012, the Keller Central marching band was Area champion and qualified for the UIL State Marching contest for the first time in school history. The band has also garnered national recognition by qualifying for semifinals at BOA Grand Nationals in 2015, and being selected as a feature band and percussion ensemble for the 2019 Music For All National Festival in Indianapolis.

The band has received straight division 1 ratings at UIL Concert and Sight-reading since 2009 and has been a State Honor band finalist multiple times since then.

Notable alumni
Zack Sanchez, American football player
Joel Bolomboy, basketball player
Austin Cutting, football player

References

External links
 Official School Website
 Keller Independent School District Website
 Athletic Booster Club
 The Official Central Journalism Website, featuring The Zone Newspaper, The Bolt Yearbook, and The Circuit

Educational institutions established in 2003
Public high schools in Fort Worth, Texas
Keller Independent School District high schools
2003 establishments in Texas